Hyperlactation Syndrome is the condition where breast milk overflow occurs because of increased milk production. The milk may come out fast and forcibly, making it difficult for the baby to nurse well.

Symptoms for the mother include breasts that never feel soft and comfortable, even after feeding, mastitis, blocked ducts and sore nipples.

Signs

Mother signs 
The mother's breast may feel full and engorged all the time. There may be the pain in the breast while feeding as well as leakage of milk in between the feeds.

Baby's signs 
Most babies rarely react to a larger flow of milk since it could be as much as they require, too. Also babies usually get confused while breastfeeding.

Causes 
Some mothers make too much milk, while others make too little, and for most of them it's just a matter of syncing up with their baby's needs. Occasionally, though, a mom will continue to make an overabundance of milk even after her milk supply is established.

References 

Breast diseases
Breastfeeding
Pathology of pregnancy, childbirth and the puerperium